Kothnur is a census town in Bangalore district in the Indian state of Karnataka.

Demographics
 India census, Kothnur had a population of 20,835. Males constitute 53% of the population and females 47%. Koththanur has an average literacy rate of 67%, higher than the national average of 59.5%: male literacy is 73%, and female literacy is 61%. In Kothnur, 13% of the population is under 6 years of age.

References

Cities and towns in Bangalore Urban district